The New Jersey Junction Railroad (NJJ) was part of the New York Central Railroad and ran along the Hudson River in Hudson County, New Jersey, from the West Shore Railroad (NYCRR) yards at Weehawken Terminal south to Jersey City. It later owned an extension to the north, separated by the Weehawken yard from the original line.

The company was incorporated under the laws of New Jersey on February 27, 1886. On July 1, 1886, it was leased for 100 years to the New York Central and Hudson River Railroad. The line opened for freight in May 1887 and passengers in June 1887.

About 0.24 mile of the New York and Fort Lee Railroad was leased to the New Jersey Junction Railroad on June 30, 1886.

The NJJ owned the entire stock of the New Jersey Shore Line Railroad, Jersey City and Bayonne Railroad, and State Line and Stony Point Railroad; only the former constructed track. On October 24, 1914, the NJJ was reorganized as a merger with the New Jersey Shore Line Railroad.

In 1952, the New York Central Railroad officially subsumed the New Jersey Junction Railroad, which it had controlled since its beginning. The line eventually passed under control of CSX and Norfolk Southern as their River Line and Weehawken Branch. The southern section is now being used for New Jersey Transit's Hudson-Bergen Light Rail, from North Bergen south to Hoboken, with freight now running along the former Northern Railroad of New Jersey on the other side of the New Jersey Palisades.

See also
River Line (Conrail)
Timeline of Jersey City area railroads

Defunct New Jersey railroads
Predecessors of the New York Central Railroad
Railway companies established in 1886
Railway companies disestablished in 1952